Anne Gastinel is a French cellist and professor. She was born on October 14, 1971, in the town of Tassin-la-Demi-Lune. Tassin-la-Demi-Lune is in the south east of France close to Lyon. She has three sisters and one brother. Both of her parents are musicians and passed their passion down to their children. Her father composes pieces and her mother plays the piano.

Her musical career started at the age of four when she began playing one of her sister's cellos as well as began studying the piano and oboe. Her first televised concert with an orchestra was at the age of ten where she was a soloist (1981). One year after her televised solo, Gastinel entered the Lyons Conservatory School to begin her formal music education. At age 15 (1986), Gastinel finished first place in her class at the Musical Conservatory School in Lyon, France. After her time in Lyon she moved on to study at the more advanced National Musical Conservatory in Paris. In Paris her teachers included famous musicians and fellow cellists such as Yo-Yo Ma, Paul Tortelier, and János Starker; all of whom made their impression on her and her musical style.

In 1990 Gastinel competed on the Eurovision Tournament in Vienna, where she represented France. She has participated in many more international contests since then and has done extremely well in several including the Cheveningen, Prague, and Rostropovich Competitions. Gastinel was the first French artist to reach the finals in the Prague International Competition in forty years and won first place in the International Competition of Scheveningen. By the young age of 18 (1989), this child prodigy had already performed in more than 50 cities all over Europe. Later on she began a worldwide solo career. She has traveled worldwide around many different continents such as Europe, Africa, Asia, and the Americas and has won many prizes for her work. She has played at many famous musical halls around the world during her years of touring. Some of the more notable venues are Santori Hall in Tokyo Japan, Victoria Hall in Geneva Switzerland, Berlin Konzerthaus in Germany, the Théâtre des Champs Elysées in Paris, France, and Victoria Hall in London, England.

Gastinel has been awarded many prizes for her performances and albums. She was named “Victore of Music” in all three categories of competition; most inspirational, best track of the year, and soloist of the year. She is the only musician who has completed this feat. She also has received awards early on in her musical career such as  “Most Promising Young Talent” in 1994 and Best Recording of the year in 1995 as well as the Prix-Fnac in 1995 and 2000. She was named “Woman of Gold” in 2002 for her work in the performing arts category. In 1997, Gastinel was named the Ambassador of French cello and thus was chosen to play Pablo Casal's Goffriller cello (valued at 5 million francs) for one year by Pablo Casal's wife, New Yorker Marta Casals-Istomin. Currently, she plays on a 1690 Testore cello given to her by the Fonds Instrumental Francais Association.
She has recorded 14 albums since 1989 and many of them have been collaborations. She is mainly associated with the recording label Naive but she has also worked with the record labels Valois and Ottavo. Gastinel has worked with several pianists including François-Frédéric Guy on several different albums and Claire Désert on her album Schubert: Arpeggione in 2006. She has also collaborated with a guitarist named Pablo Marquez on her Spanish influenced album, Iberica, in 2009. Gastinel mainly plays classical and baroque music and has played many pieces by famous musicians such as Haydn, Rachmaninov, Brahms, Strauss, Dvorak, Bach, Beethoven, and Debussy. Gastinel is still an active musician and has been invited to be a soloist at the Choeur Britten concert on the 15th of April 2014.

Gastinel has played famous pieces in famous concert halls, she has played under the direction of several famous conductors, and she also has played with many other talented musicians including but not limited to German conductor Kurt Sanderling, French conductor Emmanuel Krivine, Russian conductor Semyon Bychkov, Israeli conductor Pinchas Steinberg, Russian violinist Yuri Bashmet, and English violinist Lord Yehudi Menuhin.

Gastinel is now not only a musician but has also been a professor of cello in Lyon at the National Conservatory of Music and Dance since 2003. This is the same school she started her formal musical education at many years earlier. In an interview Gastinel described the essence of music as the joy of personal exchange and sharing passion. She is married, has two children, Jules and Madeline, and still lives in Lyon.

References

External links
https://web.archive.org/web/20140520220123/http://www.berlinkonzert-ott.de/english/gastinel_bio_en.html
http://www.francemusique.fr/emission/au-diable-beauvert/2013-2014/anne-gastinel-02-09-2014-12-37  
http://musicalworld.com/artists/anne-gastinel/biography.html 
http://www.vivre-a-chalon.com/lire_Choeur-Britten-Mardi-15-avril---20h,2303fba0ad337bfc90f0e6826f3c6329a5eb0ad1.html 
http://www.catcountry995.ca/Music/Artist.aspx?id=804543 
http://www.auditorium-lyon.com/Interpretes/Artistes-invites/Anne-Gastinel 
https://web.archive.org/web/20160303230154/http://www.music.lv/bachfestival/en/index.asp?pageId=609&subPageId=582&pageAction=showSubPage 
http://www.lexpress.fr/informations/anne-gastinel-la-jeune-fille-au-vieux-violoncelle_626181.html 
http://blog.radioclassique.fr/olivierbellamy/2011/10/12/anne-gastinel-vingt-ans-de-passion/ 
http://www.cellist.nl/database/showcellist.asp?id=332

1971 births
Living people
French women classical cellists
French music educators
Knights of the Ordre national du Mérite
Eurovision Young Musicians Finalists
21st-century French women musicians
Women music educators
21st-century cellists